Mette Marie Astrup (25 April 1760 – 16 February 1834) was a Danish actress, one of the best known of her time in Denmark. She enjoyed a career totaling fifty years at the Royal Danish Theatre in Copenhagen.

Biography
Astrup was born in Copenhagen, Denmark. She was the child of Sven Andersen Astrup, a former servant who was employed as porter at the Royal Danish Theatre upon its foundation in 1748. She began her performing career in 1772, and by 1773 was employed at the Theatre itself, which was always short of female actors in the 18th century.

She became a student of the theatre's primadonna Lisbeth Cathrine Amalie Rose (1738–1793), and was widely regarded as her successor; she played romantic parts, dramatic tragedy and, in her later years, gentle mothers. From 1777 until its dissolution in 1779 she was a member of Det Dramatiske Selskab, a students' club for young actors, which ceased after a short but very active period of cultural development, and whilst there was a student of Fredrik Schwarz. She was described as dignified and with a great feeling for her costume, which was designed by the actors themselves. However, when the "new style" of acting was introduced onto the stage in 1808, her way of acting then became unfashionable.

She played Leonore in  Den Stundenlöse (1773), Else Skolemesters in Barselstuen (1778), both plays by Ludvig Holberg as well as Lady Macbeth in the play Macbeth (1817) by William Shakespeare.

Astrup never married, but she did have a long-term relationship with Adam Hauch, who was director of the Royal Danish Theatre from 1794 to 1798, and again from 1801 to 1811 (she had a son, Adam Wilhelm Astrup, believed to have been fathered by him). She lived all her life in the porter's residence at the theatre; this position was inherited within her family, and was subsequently managed by her mother Dorthe, and then by her older sister Sophie, after her father's death in 1792. Her other sister, Anne Marie, also worked at the Theatre, as a dresser in the wardrobe department. Mette Marit Astrup gave her last performance in 1823, retiring after fifty years on the stage.

List of roles

Comediehuset
 1773	Den sanseløse	Isabella
 1773	Sidney as Mathurine
 1774	Coquetten og den forstilte skønhed as Lydia, Cydalises kusine
 1774	De pæne piger as Leonore
 1774	Den lønlige kærlighed as Lucilla
 1774	Den politiske kandestøber

Royal Danish Theatre
 1775	List over list as Caroline, Mad. Argans datter
 1775	Menechmi as Isabelle
 1776	Den taknemmelige søn as Grethe
 1776	Den uformodentlige hjemkomst as Juliane
 1776	Søhavnen as Benjamine
 1776	Væddemaalet as Frøken Adelaide
 1777	Den gerrige as Mariane, Cleantes Elskede
 1777	Den straffede gæk as Angelique
 1777	Den tredieve aars pige as Julie
 1777	Det genstridige sindelag as Angelique
 1777	Diderich Menschenskræk as Hyacinthe, Leanders Kæreste
 1777	Gert Westphaler as Leonora
 1778	Balders død as Valkyrie
 1778	Barselstuen as Else Skolemesters
 1778	Celinde as Markisen af Boisville
 1778	Den knurvorne doktor as Clarice Terignans Kæreste
 1778	Den politiske kandestøber as Mad. Sanderus, raadsherreinde
 1778	Den aabenmundede as Hortensia
 1778	Det lykkelige skibbrud as Leonora, datter af første ægteskab
 1778	Don Ranudo de Calibrados as	Isabella, Gonzalos søster
 1778	Henrik den Fjerdes jagt as Agathe, forlovet med Richard
 1778	Hver mands ven as Hortense
 1778	Ines af Castro as Constance, forlovet med Don Pedro
 1778	Noctambulus as Rosalie
 1778	Ulysses von Ithacia as Řllegaard
 1778	Zarine as Zarine, Sacernes Dronning
 1779	Celinde as Markisen af Boisville
 1779	De forstilte utroskaber as Angelica
 1779	De nysgerrige mandfolk as Fru Lisidor
 1779	Den bedragne formynder as Emilie
 1779	Den uheldige lighed as Miss Molly, Kammerpige
 1779	Det unge menneske paa prøve as Isabelle
 1779	Faderen as Sophie, et ubekendt Fruentimmer
 1779	Forøderen as Cydalise
 1779	Hekseri as Apelone, skuespillerinde
 1779	Melampe as Philocyne
 1779	Spøgelset med trommen as Baronessen
 1779	Uden hoved og hale	Kærling
 1780	Den uformodentlige forhindring as Julie, Lycanders * broderdatter
 1780	Henrik som tjener to herrer as Lucilia
 1780	Skotlænderinden as Lindane, en Skotlænderinde
 1780	Tartuffe as Mariane, Orgons Datter
 1781	Den uheldige lighed as Fanny, Berkleys Kone
 1781	Huset i oprør as Komtesse Rosaura
 1781	Kavaleren og damen as Donna Virginia
 1781	Kun seks retter as Wilhelmine
 1781	Kærlighed paa prøve as Leonora, Leanders Kæreste
 1782	De fortrædelige hændelser as Angelique
 1782	De nysgerrige fruentimmere as Julie
 1782	Den gifte filosof as Melite, Aristes Hustru
 1782	Eugenie as Eugenie, Baronens Datter
 1782	Feen Ursel as Berthe, Dronning
 1782	Modens sæder as Julie, Gerontes Datter
 1782	Tartuffe as Mariane, Orgons datter
 1782	Ulysses von Ithacia as Pallas
 1783	Berverley as Madam Beverley
 1783	Coquetten og den forstilte kyskhed as Cydalise, Damis's Broderdatter
 1783	Den forlorne søn as Leonore, Jeronimus's Datter
 1783	Den genstridige sindelag as Angelique
 1783	Den gerrige as Mariane, Cleantes Elskede
 1783	Den værdige fader as Lovise, Wermanns Datter
 1783	Eugenie as Eugenie, Baronens Datter
 1783	Hververne as Philippine, Rosenaus Datter
 1783	Søofficererne as Frøken Winning, Sir Arthurs Myndling
 1783	Zaira as Zaire
 1784	Arsene as Myris
 1784	Bagtalelsens skole as Maria
 1784	Den butte velgører as Angelique, Fru Dalancours Søster
 1784	Den kærlige kone as Grevinde Eleonora
 1784	Den politiske kandestøber as Mad. Abrahams, raadsherreinde
 1784	Den stundesløse as Leonore
 1784	Diderich Menschenskræk as Hyacinthe, Leanders Kæreste
 1784	Tartuffe as Mariane, Orgons datter
 1785	Bagtalelsens skole as Maria
 1785	De nysgerrige mandfolk as Frøken Julie
 1785	Den døve elsker as Julie
 1785	Emilie Galotti as Emilie Galotti
 1785	Fejltagelserne as Frøken Constance
 1785	Mændenes skole as Leonore
 1786	Den løgnagtige tjener as Fru Sip
 1786	Den politiske kandestøber as Mad. Abrahams, raadsherreinde
 1786	Det unge menneske efter moden as Mariane
 1786	Fusentasten as Hypolite, Anselmes Datter
 1786	Raptussen as Jenny
 1786	Vestindianeren as Lovise, Kapt. Dudleys Datter
 1787	Bagtalelsens skole as Maria
 1787	De nysgerrige fruentimmere as Julie
 1787	Democritus as Criseis, Thalers fornemste Datter
 1787	Den virkelige vise as Jomfru Sophie Vanderk, Vanderks Datter
 1787	Fændriken	Sophie, hans Datter
 1787	Tartuffe as Mariane, Orgons datter
 1788	Aktierne as Frøken Augusta
 1788	Bagtalelsens skole as Maria
 1788	Bussemanden as Fru Staverup
 1788	Den politiske kandestøber as Mad. Sanderus, raadsherreinde
 1788	Den butte velgører as Angelique, Fru Dalancours Søster
 1788	Den gerrige as Mariane, Cleantes Elskede
 1788	Den politiske kandestøber as Mad. Abrahams, raadsherreinde
 1788	Den vægelsindede as Helene, Erastes Søster
 1788	Forvandlingerne as Christiane
 1788	Hekseri as Lucretia
 1788	Jægerne as Cordelila v. Zeck
 1788	Raptussen as Jenny
 1788	Ringen as Henriette von Darring
 1789	Bagtalelsens skole as Maria
 1789	Datum in blanco as Leonore
 1789	De usynlige as Leanders Usynlige
 1789	Den politiske kandestøber as Mad. Sanderus, raadsherreinde
 1789	Den skinsyge kone as Lady Freelove
 1789	Diderich Menschenskræk as Hyacinthe, Leanders Kæreste
 1789	Tartuffe as Mariane, Orogns datter
 1789	Henrik den fjerdes jagt as Agathe, bondepige,  Richards forlovede
 1790	Den forliebte autor og tjener as Lucinde, en ung Enkefrue
 1790	Frode og Fingal as Halfdan, Prins fra Thanos Land eller Lifland
 1790	Fætteren i Lissabon as Sophie, Alberts Datter af første ægteskab
 1790	Skotlænderinden as Lindane, en Skotlænderinde
 1791	Bagtalelsens skole as Maria
 1791	Erast as Sophie, hans Kæreste, Orgons Datter
 1791	Negeren as Anine Godbert
 1791	Aabenbar krig as Charlotte
 1792	Bagtalelsens skole as Maria
 1792	Bortførelsen as Henriette v. Sachau
 1792	Den gerrige as Mariane, Cleantes Elskede
 1792	Det gode ægteskab as Sophie, hans Kone
 1792	Myndlingerne as Augusta, deres Datter
 1792	Ringen as En Ubekendt
 1793	Bagtalelsens skole as Maria
 1793	Den mistænkelige mand as Jacinte
 1793	Den værdige fader as Lovise, Wermanns Datter
 1793	Den aabne brevveksling as Caroline
 1793	Gulddaasen as Vilhelmine, Visbergs datter
 1793	Ja eller nej as Lucie
 1794	Høstdagen as Amalila Fersen, hans Broderdatter
 1795	Bagtalelsens skole as Maria
 1795	Bryllupshøjtiden as Henriette
 1795	Den godmodige familie as Madam Cleark
 1795	Eugenie as Eugenie, Baronens datter
 1795	Gamle og nye sæder as Amalia
 1795	Gulddaasen as Vilhelmine, Visbergs datter
 1795	Kjolen fra Lyon as Fru v. Hornau
 1795	Raptussen as Jenny
 1795	Ægteskabsskolen as Amalie, hans Kone, Silkeborgs datter
 1796	Advokaterne as Sophie
 1796	Dormon og Welhelmine as Frøken Wilhelmine
 1796	Dyveke as Anna Møenstrup, dronningens hofmesterinde
 1796	Gulddaasen as Vilhelmine, Vilbergs datter
 1796	Rejsen til byen as Frøken Reising
 1796	Væddemaalet as Markisen af Blainville
 1796	Ægtefolkene fra landet as Cecilia
 1797	Bagtalelsens skole as Lady Teazle
 1797	De snorrige fætre as Fru Dormin, Enke
 1797	Den politiske kandestøber as Mad. Abrahams, raadsherreinde
 1797	Den sanseløse as Clarice
 1797	Embedsiver as Hofraadinde Rosen
 1797	Galejslaven as Cecilie, Enke af Orfeuil
 1797	Høstdagen as Amalila Fersen, hans Broderdatter
 1797	Ja-ordet as Charlotte
 1797	Menneskehad og anger as Grevinden
 1797	Modens sæder as Fru v. Elsing, en ung Enke
 1797	Navnsygen as Sophie, Konferensraadens Myndling
 1797	Sammensværgelsen mod Peter den Store as Cyrilla
 1798	Bagtalelsens skole as Lady Teazle
 1798	De to poststationer as Lady Bull
 1798	Den ubesindige gæstfrihed as Ketty
 1798	Den værdige fader as Grevinde Amaldi
 1798	Emilie Galotti as Grevinde Orsina
 1798	Enken og ridehesten as Angelique, hans Kone
 1798	Falsk undseelse as Fru Heldmand
 1798	Ringen as Baronesse von Schønhelm
 1798	Ringen as Majorinde
 1798	Skumlerne as Emilie
 1798	Victorine as Franciska
 1799	Bortførelsen as Vilhelmine v. Sachau, hans Broderdatter
 1799	Den forladte datter as Henriette Skumring, baronesse
 1799	Emigranterne as Amalie Lindberg
 1799	Udstyret as Sophie Wallmann
 1800	Advokaterne as Sophie
 1800	De pudserlige arvinger as Madam Sommer, Skuespillerinde
 1800	Den aabne brevveksling as Caroline
 1800	Dyveke as Anna Møenstrup, Dronningens Hofmesterinde
 1800	Gulddaasen as Vilhelmine, Visbergs datter
 1800	Herman von Unna as Prinsessen af Ratibor
 1800	Udstyret as Sophie Wallmann
 1800	Aabenbar as krig	Charlotte
 1801	Advokaterne as Sophie
 1801	Den døve elsker as Julie
 1801	Den forladte datter as Henriette Skumring, baronesse
 1801	Den ubesindige gæstfrihed as Ketty
 1801	Fejltagelserne as Frøken Constance
 1801	Fændriken	Sophie
 1801	Gulddaasen as Vilhelmine, Visbergs datter
 1801	Hekseri as Apelone, Skuespillerinde
 1801	Hvad vil folk sige ? as Mistress Jenny Hartley
 1801	Hververne as Philippine, Rosenaus Datter
 1801	Løgneren as Miss Grantam
 1801	Rejsen til byen as Frøken Reising
 1802	Bagtalelsens skole as Lady Teazle
 1802	Den forladte datter as Henriette Skumring, baronesse
 1802	Den gerrige as Mariane, Cleantes Elskede
 1802	Dyveke as Anna Møenstrup, Dronningens Hofmesterinde
 1802	Octavia as Kleopatra, Dronning i ægypten
 1802	Syv tusinde rigsdalere as Emilie
 1802	Værtshuset as Fru Derval
 1803	De lystige passagerer as Madame Saint-Hilaire, Skuespillerinde
 1803	Den forladte datter as Henriette Skumring, baronesse
 1803	En time borte as Jenny
 1803	Rosenkæderne as Fru Norbek
 1804	Advokaterne as Sophie
 1804	Bagtalelsens skole as Lady Teazle
 1804	Kvindelist as Amelina, hans Søster
 1804	Maleren af kærlighed as Clemence, Merforts Datter og * Solanges Kone
 1804	Rejsen til Ostindien as Arabella
 1805	Bagtalelsens skole as Lady Teazle
 1805	Den forladte datter as Henritte Skumring, baronesse
 1805	Selim, Prins af Algier as Saphira, Enkedronning af Algier
 1806	Strikkepindene as Amalia, hans Kone
 1808	Bagtalelsens skole as Lady Teazle
 1808	Den forladte datter as Henriette Skumring, baronesse
 1808	Kærlighed under maske as Ung Enke
 1809	Advokaterne as Sophie
 1809	Bagtalelsens skole as Lady Teazle
 1809	Den vovelige prøve as Fru Dupont
 1809	Marionetterne as Celestine, Valberts Søster
 1810	Bagtalelsens skole as Lady Teazle
 1810	Den forladte datter as Henriette Skumring, baronesse
 1810	Den unge moder as Madame Dorimont
 1810	Snedkeren i Lifland as Catharina
 1811	Tyve-aars-festen as Majorinde
 1812	Advokaterne as Sophie
 1812	Bagtalelsens skole as Lady Teazle
 1812	Den forladte datter as Henriette Skumring, baronesse
 1813	Advokaterne as Sophie
 1813	Bagtalelsens skole as Lady Teazle
 1812	Henrik den fjerdes jagt as Agathe, en Bondepige i Lieursain
 1817	Macbeth as Lady Macbeth
 1818	Fruentimmerhævn as Fru Saint-Elme
 1821	De pudserlige arvinger as Madam Sommer, Skuespillerinde
 1823	Emilie Galotti as Grevinde Orsina

Hofteatret
 1779	Forøderen as Cydalise
 1780	Henrik som tjener to herrer as Lucilia
 1782	Tartuffe as Mariane, Orgons datter
 1784	Bagtalelsens skole as Maria
 1784	Tartuffe as Mariane, Orgons datter
 1785	Bagtalelsens skole as Maria
 1786	Tartuffe as Mariane, Orogns datter
 1815	Machbeth as Lady Macbeth

References

1760 births
1834 deaths
People from Copenhagen
18th-century Danish actresses
Danish stage actresses